Las Almunias de Rodellar is a locality located in the municipality of Bierge, in Huesca province, Aragon, Spain. As of 2020, it has a population of 17.

Geography 
Las Almunias de Rodellar is located 60km east-northeast of Huesca.

References

Populated places in the Province of Huesca